Smriti Shriniwas Mandhana (born 18 July 1996) is an Indian cricketer who plays for the Indian women's national team and signed to play for the Royal Challengers Bangalore in the WPL.

She plays for the Maharashtra cricket team in domestic cricket.

In June 2018, the Board of Control for Cricket in India (BCCI) awarded her 'the Best Women's International Cricketer' in BCCI awards. In December 2018, the International Cricket Council (ICC) awarded her with the Rachael Heyhoe-Flint Award for the best female cricketer of the year. On 30 December 2021, she became a nominee of the ICC Women's T20 Player of the Year. In December 2021, she, Tammy Beaumont, Lizelle Lee and Gaby Lewis were nominated for the ICC Women's Cricketer of the Year. In January 2022, the ICC awarded her with the Rachael Heyhoe-Flint Award for the ICC Women's Cricketer of the Year.

On 13 February 2023 at the inaugural Women's Premier League auction, Smriti was signed by the Royal Challengers Bangalore in INR 3.40 crore.

Early and personal life
Mandhana was born on 18 July 1996 in Mumbai to Smita and Shrinivas Mandhana in a Marwari family .

When she was two, the family moved to Madhavnagar, Sangli in Maharashtra, where she completed her schooling. Both her father and brother, Shravan, played cricket at the district-level, for Sangli. She was inspired to take up cricket after watching her brother play at the Maharashtra state Under-16s tournaments. At the age of nine, she was selected in the Maharashtra's Under-15 team. At eleven, she was picked for the Maharashtra Under-19s team.

Mandhana's family is closely involved in her cricketing activities.  Her father Shrinivas, a chemical distributor, takes care of her cricket programme, her mother Smita is in charge of her diet, clothing and other organisational aspects, and her brother Shravan still bowls to her in the nets.

Domestic career
Her first breakthrough came in October 2013, when she became the first Indian woman to achieve a double-hundred in a one-day game.  Playing for Maharashtra against Gujarat, she scored an unbeaten 224 off 150 balls in the West Zone Under-19 Tournament, at the Alembic Cricket Ground in Vadodara.

In the 2016 Women's Challenger Trophy, Mandhana scored three half-centuries for India Red in as many games, and helped her team win the trophy by making an unbeaten 62 off 82 balls in the final against India Blue. With 192 runs, she emerged as the tournament's top-scorer.

In September 2016, Mandhana was signed up for a one-year deal with Brisbane Heat for the Women's Big Bash League (WBBL), and along with Harmanpreet Kaur, became one of the first two Indians to be signed up for the League. Playing against Melbourne Renegades in January 2017, she fell awkwardly while fielding after bowling the final ball of her over hurting her knee. She was ruled out of the rest of the tournament which she ended having scored 89 runs in 12 innings.

In June 2018, Mandhana signed for Kia Super League defending champions Western Storm, becoming the first Indian to play in the league. In November 2018, she was named in the Hobart Hurricanes' squad for the 2018–19 Women's Big Bash League season. In 2021, she was drafted by Southern Brave for the inaugural season of The Hundred. She played for them in 7 games and scored 167 runs before leaving them for India's tour of Australia.

In September 2021, she was named in the Sydney Thunder's squad for the 2021-22 Women's Big Bash League season. She scored a hundred in the season, equalling the record for the tournament's highest ever score.

In February 2022, she was retained by Southern Brave for the 2022 edition of the Hundred.

In February 2023, in the inaugural WPL auction, she was bought by Royal Challengers Bangalore for ₹3.4 crores. It was the highest bid for a player in that auction. She was also named elected captain of the team.

International career
Mandhana made her Test debut in August 2014 against England at Wormsley Park.  She helped her team to win the match by scoring 22 and 51 in her first and second innings, respectively; in the latter innings, she shared in an opening-wicket partnership of 76 runs with Thirush Kamini, chasing 182.

In the second ODI game of India's tour of Australia in 2016 at the Bellerive Oval in  Hobart, Mandhana scored her maiden international hundred (102 off 109 balls), in a losing cause. Mandhana was the only Indian player to be named in the ICC Women's Team of the Year 2016.

Mandhana came into the team for the 2017 World Cup after recovering from an injury she sustained, an anterior cruciate ligament rupture, during her time at the WBBL in January that year. In her five-month recovery period, she missed the World Cup Qualifier and the Quadrangular Series in South Africa. She began the World Cup with a 90 against England in Derby, in the first of the group matches. She helped her team win by 35 runs, and was named the player of the match. followed by her second hundred in a One Day International against West Indies,(106*)

Mandhana was part of the Indian team to reach the final of the 2017 Women's Cricket World Cup where the team lost to England by nine runs.

Smriti Mandhana scored the fastest fifty for India in Women's T20Is of just 24 balls against New Zealand in February 2019. In March 2018, she also scored the fifty for India in a Women's Twenty20 International (WT20I) fixture, taking 30 balls to reach a half-century against Australia in the 2017–18 India women's Tri-Nation Series. The following month, she was named the player of the series, for the three WODI matches played England. On 3 August 2018, she scored the first century in the 2018 Women's Cricket Super League.

In October 2018, she was named in India's squad for the Women's World Twenty20 tournament in the West Indies. Ahead of the tournament, she was named as the star of the team. During the tournament, she became the third cricketer for India to score 1,000 runs in WT20I matches. She ended that year as the leading run-scorer in WODIs with 669 at an average of 66.90. She was adjudged the ICC Women's Cricketer of the Year and the ICC Women's ODI Player of the Year.

In February 2019, she was named as the captain of India's Women T20I squad for the three match against England. She became the youngest T20I captain for India when she led the women's team against England in the first T20I in Guwahati. At 22 years and 229 days, the India women's cricket team opener is taking over from Harmanpreet Kaur, who has been ruled out of the three-match series with an ankle injury.

In May 2019, she has won the International Woman Cricketer of the Year awards at CEAT International Cricket Awards 2019. In November 2019, during the series against West Indies, she became the third-fastest cricketer, in terms of innings, to score 2,000 runs in WODIs, doing so in her 51st innings.

In January 2020, she was named in India's squad for the 2020 ICC Women's T20 World Cup in Australia.

In May 2021, she was named in India's Test squad for their one-off match against England. In August 2021, she was also named in India's Test squad for their one-off match against Australia. In the first innings of the match, she scored her first century in Test cricket. She became the first Indian female cricketer to score a century in both ODIs and Tests in Australia. In January 2022, she was named in India's team for the 2022 Women's Cricket World Cup in New Zealand. In July 2022, she was named as the vice-captain of India's team for the cricket tournament at the 2022 Commonwealth Games in Birmingham, England.

See also
 List of centuries in women's One Day International cricket
 List of centuries in women's Test cricket

References

Further reading

External links

 

1996 births
Living people
People from Sangli
Indian women cricketers
India women Test cricketers
India women One Day International cricketers
India women Twenty20 International cricketers
Maharashtra women cricketers
Sportswomen from Maharashtra
West Zone women cricketers
Indian women cricket captains
Brisbane Heat (WBBL) cricketers
Western Storm cricketers
Hobart Hurricanes (WBBL) cricketers
IPL Trailblazers cricketers
Royal Challengers Bangalore (WPL) cricketers
Wisden Leading Woman Cricketers in the World
Recipients of the Arjuna Award
Southern Brave cricketers
Sydney Thunder (WBBL) cricketers
International Cricket Council Cricketer of the Year
Cricketers at the 2022 Commonwealth Games
Commonwealth Games silver medallists for India
Commonwealth Games medallists in cricket
20th-century Indian women
21st-century Indian women
Medallists at the 2022 Commonwealth Games